The Elmadağ Bridge, officially designated as Viaduct 15 or V15, is a railway bridge under construction near Kırıkkale, Turkey, on the Ankara-Sivas high-speed railway.

It is expected to open towards the end of 2023, along with the Ankara-Sivas high-speed railway.

References

See also
Yüksek Hızlı Tren
Sakarya Viaduct

Railway bridges in Turkey
Buildings and structures in Kırıkkale Province
Transport in Kırıkkale Province
High-speed rail in Turkey
Turkish State Railways